John Neilson Robertson (born 20 January 1953) is a Scottish former professional footballer. He provided the assisting cross for Trevor Francis to score the only goal when Nottingham Forest won the 1979 European Cup Final. A year later he scored when Forest retained the trophy 1-0 this time against Hamburger SV. At Forest he also won promotion from the 1976–77 Football League Second Division, the 1977–78 Football League First Division, the UEFA Super Cup, two Football League Cups, the 1978 FA Charity Shield and the Anglo-Scottish Cup.

He also played for the full Scotland national football team, scoring the winning goal against England in 1981 and against New Zealand in the 1982 FIFA World Cup.

He has since moved into coaching, acting as assistant to his former Nottingham Forest teammate Martin O'Neill. Robertson's last role was assistant manager at Aston Villa between 2006 and 2010.

Playing career

Nottingham Forest (first spell)
Robertson had played for Scotland at Schoolboy and Youth levels and for Drumchapel Amateurs before joining Forest in May 1970, making his debut for the team in October 1970. Although he was an infrequent member of the first team as a midfielder up to 1975, and was on the transfer list when Clough became manager, Robertson became a key player as a left winger under Clough and appeared in 243 consecutive games between December 1976 and December 1980. He scored the winning goal, a penalty, for Forest in the 1978 Football League Cup Final replay against Liverpool. He also scored the winner in the 1980 European Cup Final against Hamburg and provided the cross for the winning goal in the 1979 European Cup Final, scored by Trevor Francis, against Malmö FF.

Brian Clough, Robertson's manager at Nottingham Forest, was quoted as saying 
"John Robertson was a very unattractive young man. If one day, I felt a bit off colour, I would sit next to him. I was bloody Errol Flynn in comparison. But give him a ball and a yard of grass, and he was an artist, the Picasso of our game." In his autobiography Clough noted that "Rarely could there have been a more unlikely looking professional athlete... [He was a] scruffy, unfit, uninterested waste of time...but something told me he was worth persevering with." but that "[He] became one of the finest deliverers of a football I have ever seen – in Britain or anywhere else in the world – as fine as the Brazilians or the supremely gifted Italians." Robertson's captain at Forest, John McGovern, later said that "John Robertson was like Ryan Giggs but with two good feet, not one. He had more ability than Ryan Giggs, his ratio of creating goals was better and overall he was the superior footballer", whilst Forest coach Jimmy Gordon rated Robertson as a better player than Tom Finney and Stanley Matthews, saying that he "had something extra on top".

Later playing career
Robertson was sold to Derby County in June 1983 on a contested transfer (the fee was set by a tribunal) that soured the relationship between Clough and his former assistant Peter Taylor, but was injured soon after joining the team and failed to reproduce the form he had shown when he played for Forest. Although he rejoined Forest on a free transfer in August 1985, he remained well below his former best and moved to non-league Corby Town at the end of the 1985/86 season. He also had stints with Stamford and Grantham Town.

Coaching career
After retiring from playing, Robertson has been variously chief scout and assistant manager to former Nottingham Forest teammate Martin O'Neill at Wycombe Wanderers, Norwich City, Leicester City, Celtic and Aston Villa.

Legacy
Robertson was voted into first place in a 2015 poll by the Nottingham Post of favourite all-time Nottingham Forest players.

Personal life
Robertson's daughter, Jessica, was born in 1983 with cerebral palsy, which left her quadriplegic and unable to speak or control her movements. She had a short life expectancy. In 1994, Robertson and his former wife Sally challenged the hospital where Jessica was born for damages, claiming that they had caused her brain damage by a 12-hour delay to carry out a Caesarean section. However, they lost their High Court case.

Robertson's other daughter Liz appeared on the first ever episode of BBC's quiz show TNL: Who Dares Wins in 2007.

Robertson released his autobiography Supertramp in September 2012. He supported Rangers as a boy, but describes his time at Celtic as assistant to Martin O'Neill as the best years of his life in football.

Robertson suffered a suspected heart attack while playing tennis with former Forest teammate Liam O'Kane on 23 August 2013. Fans of Celtic, Derby County, Leicester City and Nottingham Forest took to social network sites to wish him well.

Career statistics

Club

A.  The "Other" column constitutes appearances and goals in the FA Charity Shield, Anglo-Scottish Cup, Football League Trophy, European Super Cup and Intercontinental Cup.

International

International goals
Scores and results list Scotland's goal tally first

Honours
Nottingham Forest
First Division: 1977–78
League Cup: 1977–78, 1978–79
FA Charity Shield: 1978
European Cup: 1978–79, 1979–80
European Super Cup: 1979
Anglo-Scottish Cup: 1976–77

References

External links

John Robertson international stats LondonHearts.com

1953 births
Living people
Scottish footballers
Scotland international footballers
Derby County F.C. players
Nottingham Forest F.C. players
Stamford A.F.C. players
Grantham Town F.C. managers
Aston Villa F.C. non-playing staff
Celtic F.C. non-playing staff
Leicester City F.C. non-playing staff
Norwich City F.C. non-playing staff
Wycombe Wanderers F.C. non-playing staff
1978 FIFA World Cup players
1982 FIFA World Cup players
English Football League players
People from Uddingston
Scottish Football Hall of Fame inductees
English Football Hall of Fame inductees
Drumchapel Amateur F.C. players
Association football wingers
Footballers from North Lanarkshire
Scottish football managers
UEFA Champions League winning players